Heliodoro Gustines (born 1940 in Panama City, Panama) is a retired Panamanian-born jockey and horse trainer. In 1967, Time magazine called him "the best grass-course rider in the United States".

Gustines is best known as a jockey of U.S. Racing Hall of Fame inductee Forego whom he rode in 31 consecutive races, winning 21 of them. The most important win in his riding career came in an American Classic Triple Crown race on June 1, 1968, when he rode Stage Door Johnny to victory in 2:27 1/5 in the Belmont Stakes. The following year, aboard Sharp-Eyed Quillo, he won the second leg of the Canadian Triple Crown, the Prince of Wales Stakes.

After retiring as a jockey, Heliodoro Gustines took up training.

External link
 Photo of Heliodoro Gustines on Forego

References

Living people
American jockeys
Panamanian jockeys
Sportspeople from Panama City
1940 births
Panamanian emigrants to the United States